CELSA could refer to:
 Celsa (Roman city)
 CELSA Group, multinational steel company based in Castellbisbal, Spain
 CELSA Paris, French communication and journalism school